Prora is a railway station in the town of Prora, Mecklenburg-Vorpommern, Germany. The station lies on the Lietzow-Binz railway. The train services are operated by Ostdeutsche Eisenbahn GmbH.

Train services
The station is served by the following service(s):

Regional services  Rostock - Velgast - Stralsund - Lietzow - Binz

References

Binz
Railway stations in Mecklenburg-Western Pomerania

Railway stations in Germany opened in 1939
Buildings and structures in Vorpommern-Rügen